Skokholm Lighthouse is a lighthouse on Skokholm Island, just off the southwest coast of Pembrokeshire, Wales.

This small island is a Site of Special Scientific Interest. It is owned and managed by the Wildlife Trust of South and West Wales and is the site of the United Kingdom's first bird observatory. A great variety of birds can be found on this uninhabited island.

History
The present lighthouse was constructed over several years up to 1915 and was officially opened in 1916. Forming a triangle of lights with South Bishop and the Smalls to protect shipping moving into and out of Milford Haven and the Bristol Channel, the lighthouse shines .

Construction of the present lighthouse was only enabled after the construction of a new jetty. This enabled building materials to be landed, which were then moved to the site using a narrow gauge railway, initially powered by a donkey, then a pony, and finally a tractor. Once in operation, relief was provided by boat from Holyhead. Automated in 1983, it is now monitored and controlled from the Trinity House Operations Control Centre at Harwich in Essex.

See also

 List of lighthouses in Wales
Trinity House

References

External links

 Trinity House

Lighthouses completed in 1916
Lighthouses in Pembrokeshire
1861 establishments in the United Kingdom
Grade II listed lighthouses
Grade II listed buildings in Pembrokeshire